Borović is a South Slavic surname. Notable people with the surname include:

Darinka Mirković Borović (1896–1979), Montenegrin nurse during World War I
Goran Borović, Croatian martial artist
Iva Borović (born 1988), Croatian basketball player
Nenad Borović (born 1964), Serbian politician

See also

Borovik